Sayward is a village located in the Sayward Valley on the northeast coast of Vancouver Island in British Columbia, Canada.

The village (like its West Kootenays namesake) was called after William Parsons Sayward, a successful Victoria lumber merchant who was born in Maine in 1818 and came to Victoria from California in 1858. The 2016 population of the village was 311, down from 341 in 2006 and 379 in 2001. The village lies off the coast of Hardwicke Island.

Demographics 

See also

Sayward Valley

References

External links

Villages in British Columbia
Northern Vancouver Island
Populated places in the Strathcona Regional District